Greg Carey may refer to:

Greg Carey (ice hockey) (born 1990), Canadian ice hockey player
Greg Carey (voice actor), Australian-born voice actor